Aï Keïta Yara is a Burkinabè actress who played the lead role in the 1996 film Sarraounia.

Career 
Her first movie was Sarraounia (1986), where she played Sarraounia, the queen the movie is named after. Sarraounia won several awards, after which she was able to act in more movies and television shows, including the 2004 comedy-drama Tasuma. She has appeared in about 30 films including the 1995 film Haramuya and the 2018 film The Three Lascars (French: Les trois lascars). 

As of 2011, she was working as a civil servant processing medical records at Yalgado National Hospital Center in Ouagadougou.

Personal life 
Keïta is married with two children, and speaks Fula, Dyula, Mooré, Zarma and French.

Her maternal grandfather was born in Senegal, before travelling to Burkina Faso with his first wife. When he arrived in Burkina Faso he married a woman from the village of Mardaga in Tapoa Province who later became Keïta's maternal grandmother.

References

External links 
 
 Aï Keïta Yara on Africultures (in French)

Burkinabé film actors
People from Ouagadougou
Burkinabé women
Hospital administrators
Year of birth missing (living people)
Living people